The fencing competition at the 1983 Mediterranean Games was held in Casablanca, Morocco.

Medalists

Men's events

Women's events

Medal table

References
1983 Mediterranean Games report at the International Committee of Mediterranean Games (CIJM) website
List of Olympians who won medals at the Mediterranean Games at Olympedia.org

M
Sports at the 1983 Mediterranean Games
1983